Thriller 25 is the 25th anniversary edition reissue of American singer Michael Jackson's sixth studio album Thriller (1982). The original album has sold 70 million copies worldwide, making it the best-selling album of all time. Thriller 25 was released by Sony BMG's reissue division, Legacy Recordings. It is the first Jackson album with an age certificate. Along with the original material, the reissue contains remixes, new material, a DVD (for some versions) and collaborations with several contemporary artists. Thriller 25 was one of the last recorded works released during Jackson's lifetime, which he was moreover deeply involved with, as Jackson co-produced all of the newly remixed tracks.

The prospect of a "second chapter" to Thriller was first publicly discussed on Access Hollywood in late 2006. Jackson said he would discuss the idea with collaborator will.i.am. Thriller 25 was released on February 8, 2008 in Australia, on February 11, 2008 internationally, and on February 12, 2008 in the United States, by Epic Records, Legacy Recordings and MJJ Productions. To help promote Thriller 25, Jackson's website was recreated and accounts on both MySpace and Facebook were set up. On February 3, 2008, a SoBe advertisement was aired during Super Bowl XLII to an audience of over 95 million viewers. The ad aired again at the 50th Annual Grammy Awards on February 10, 2008.

Thriller 25 debuted at number one on the Billboard Top Pop Catalog Albums and in nine other countries. It was a commercial success, selling three million copies worldwide until Jackson's death in June 2009, and was generally well received among critics, despite their view that the new material was not as inspiring as the original. Thriller 25 was the best-selling catalog album in the US of 2008. Two singles, "The Girl Is Mine 2008" and "Wanna Be Startin' Somethin' 2008", were released from the album to moderate success, and a number of the other remixes charted despite no physical release.

Background 

Jackson released his sixth studio album, Thriller, on November 30, 1982. With sales estimated to be over 70 million copies worldwide, Thriller became the world's best-selling album of all time; the album was the first in history to yield seven top-ten singles. The success of Thriller put Jackson into the dominating position of pop music, becoming an international pop-cultural icon.

Jackson was asked about a "second chapter" to Thriller on Access Hollywood in late 2006. He said he would discuss it with collaborator will.i.am, but had not yet considered it, commenting "No I haven't really thought about it in that way but I would give it more thought. We haven't really discussed it yet, on that level, but I'm sure at some point we will. But it's a great thought." will.i.am served as executive producer; the album's release was announced in an Epic Records press release on November 30, 2007.

Release 
Thriller 25 was released on CD and vinyl and included seven bonus tracks: the previously unreleased ballad "For All Time" (with backing provided by Toto), Vincent Price's voice-over and five remixes featuring contemporary artists Fergie and Akon. It also included a DVD featuring three award-winning music videos, the Emmy-nominated Motown 25 "Billie Jean" performance, and a booklet with a message from Jackson. "For All Time" supposedly dates from 1982, but leaks often credit it as being from Dangerous sessions. Despite this, a new bridge was used in the Thriller 25 release.

On the iTunes Store, Zune Marketplace, and Amazon MP3, a "Super Deluxe Edition" can be purchased which also features the bonus material from Thriller: Special Edition, "Billie Jean (Underground Mix)", an instrumental "Thriller" mix, an extended "Billie Jean" and a digital booklet. Copies bought in Target, Best Buy, Circuit City and Independent Music Stores in the US feature the bonus tracks "Billie Jean (Four on the Floor Club Mix)", "Thriller (Def Thrill Remix)", "Wanna Be Startin' Somethin' (Extended 12" Mix)" and "Billie Jean (Four on the Floor Radio Mix)" respectively. Sony also released a "fan pack" containing Thriller 25 and the Number Ones DVD.

Promotion 
To help promote the album, Jackson's website was recreated and accounts on both MySpace and Facebook were set up. On February 3, 2008, a Sobe advertisement was aired during Super Bowl XLII to over 95 million Americans, with Naomi Campbell and Sanam Nazar CGI lizards dancing to "Thriller". The ad aired again at the Grammys on February 10, 2008. In the United Kingdom, Odeon Cinemas ran free Thriller viewings on February 8 and 9, 2008 and television adverts announcing the release were aired throughout Europe.

"The Girl Is Mine 2008" and "Wanna Be Startin' Somethin' 2008" were the first singles taken from the album. "The Girl Is Mine 2008" reached number two in Japan, three in Mexico, six in the Netherlands and the top 20 positions in the major European markets. "Wanna Be Startin' Somethin' 2008" reached number three in Sweden, four in New Zealand, eight in Australia, 10 in France and 32 in Canada, but had disappointing sales in America. These were Jackson's first singles since "One More Chance" in 2003. The album track "Beat It 2008" also began charting in European countries, reaching number 26 in Switzerland, 31 in Denmark, 43 in Sweden, 60 in Japan, 74 in Germany, 75 in Austria, and 77 in Canada. as did "Billie Jean 2008", reaching 91 in Germany.

Critical reception 

Critics reacted positively to the album, much like their review on the original. All reviews noted that the album is still enjoyable, 25 years on. AllMusic explains, "... 'Wanna Be Startin' Somethin'' and 'Billie Jean' remain startling in their futuristic funk and 'Baby Be Mine' ... sounds positively incandescent ..." Rolling Stone gave it a full five stars while giving the original only four, saying: "Thriller [25] has MJ at his breathiest and most salacious ('PYT'), and his most beautifully fragile ('Human Nature', so open and brave it makes 'She's Out of My Life' seem phony)".

MTV said, "... it's pretty rare to see a reissue loaded with as much contemporary appeal as this one", and reacted positively to the new tracks, calling them "silver bars". The new material received further praise, with the ballad "For All Time" being described as "perfectly fine" by AllMusic. Rolling Stone described the new version of "Wanna Be Startin' Somethin'" as "actually kind of great — he [Akon] slows it down into a piano ballad, lingering over the easily obscured lyrics." Pop Matters stated that the new version of "The Girl Is Mine" is better than the original, not losing anything with the removal of Paul McCartney. However, most critics agreed that the new versions were not as inspiring as the originals; some even said that the guest artists were the wrong choice. AllMusic notes, "for whatever reason, such Michael-mimicking superstars as Justin Timberlake and Chris Brown did not participate, but Akon, Fergie, and will.i.am did."

Commercial performance 
Thriller 25 was a commercial success. It peaked at number one in 11 countries and Europe. It peaked at number two in the United States, number three in the United Kingdom and reached the top ten in over 30 national charts. Thriller 25 spent three weeks at number one in France and two weeks at number one in Belgium. The album has been certified gold in 11 countries, including the United Kingdom. In Poland, the album was certified gold, reaching number six on the chart on its release day, and is Jackson's highest-charting album in Norway. In France Thriller 25 received a 2× Gold certification, and in Poland it was certified platinum.

In the United States, Thriller 25 was the second-best-selling album of its release week, selling 166,000 copies, 14,000 short of reaching the number one position. It was ineligible for the Billboard 200 chart as a re-release but entered the Pop Catalog Charts at number one (where it stayed for 10 non-consecutive weeks), with the best sales on that chart since December 1996. That November, Thriller 25 spent an 11th non-consecutive week atop the U.S. catalog chart. This brought U.S. sales of the album to 688,000 copies, making it the best-selling catalog album of 2008, selling 1.2 million U.S. copies and three million shipments worldwide until Jackson's death in June 2009. This was Jackson's best launch since Invincible in 2001. Like the artist's other albums, Thriller 25 saw a resurgence of interest following Jackson's death.

Track listing 

Notes
  signifies a co-producer
 "Got the Hots" was re-recorded as "Baby's Got It Bad" for Siedah Garrett's 1988 album Kiss of Life; Rod Temperton and Garrett are credited as the updated song's composers.
 The Target, Best Buy, and Independent US Music Store bonus track editions were labeled incorrectly with "Billie Jean (1982 Club Remix)", "Thriller (1982 Def Remix)", and "Billie Jean (1982 Radio Edit Mix)" respectively. These mixes were actually made in 1992, as part of a remix project by Jackson and various DJs in the early '90s.
 The Target, Best Buy, Circuit City, and Independent US Music Store releases do not mention the bonus tracks in their album booklets, but they do appear as separate tracks on the CDs. The bonus tracks are only mentioned on a sticker that appears with these respective releases.

Thriller 25: Limited Japanese Single Collection 

On March 28, 2008, a limited edition of Thriller 25 was released in Japan. The limited-edition box set contains 14 tracks divided among seven CD singles from the Thriller album, with two tracks on each CD; the A-side being the main single taken from the original album, and a B-side.

CD 1
 "The Girl Is Mine" (with Paul McCartney) - 3:41
 "Can't Get Outta the Rain" - 4:08

CD 2
 "Billie Jean" - 4:53
 "It's the Falling in Love" - 3:48

CD 3
 "Beat It" - 4:17
 "Get on the Floor" (Album Version #2) - 4:39

CD 4
 "Wanna Be Startin' Somethin'" (7" Edit) - 4:17
 "Wanna Be Startin' Somethin'" (7" Instrumental) - 4:17

CD 5
 "Human Nature" (Album Edit) - 3:45
 "Baby Be Mine " - 4:20

CD 6
 "P.Y.T. (Pretty Young Thing)" - 4:00
 "Workin' Day and Night" (Edited Version) (with The Jacksons, live recording from the 1981 album The Jacksons Live!) - 4:26

CD 7
 "Thriller" (Special Edit) - 4:39
 "Things I Do for You" (Edited Version) (with The Jacksons, live recording from the 1981 album The Jacksons Live!) - 3:37

Personnel

Charts

Weekly charts

Year-end charts

Certifications and sales

Release history

Notes

References 

2008 albums
Michael Jackson albums
Albums produced by Michael Jackson
Albums produced by Quincy Jones
Albums produced by Akon
Albums produced by Kanye West
Albums produced by will.i.am
Epic Records albums
Reissue albums

ja:スリラー (アルバム)#Thriller 25